Split Screen is a television series that originally aired from 1997 to 2001 on IFC. The series focused on independent filmmaking in America and was hosted by John Pierson.

Split Screen featured segments from many notable filmmakers, actors, and actresses including: Kevin Smith, Spike Lee, Matt Damon, Edward Norton, Buck Henry, Wes Anderson, Steve Buscemi, Harmony Korine, John Waters, John Turturro, Christopher Walken, Richard Linklater, Errol Morris, Miranda July, and William H. Macy.

The Blair Witch Project first received notoriety as a segment on Split Screen.

It has been picked up by The Criterion Collection for their new online-only channel.

References

See also
 

1997 American television series debuts
2001 American television series endings
IFC (American TV channel) original programming